Chhokran is a village in Jalandhar District of Punjab State, India. The village is administrated by Sarpanch who is elected representative of village.

Caste 
The village has schedule caste (SC) constitutes 50.87% of total population of the village and it doesn't have any Schedule Tribe (ST) population.

Education 
The village has Government primary school (GPS) and it is a Punjabi Medium, Co-educational school. The nearest high school located 1 km in Moron and 2 km away in Apra.

References 

Villages in Jalandhar district
Villages in Phillaur tehsil